KMZT (1260 AM, K-Mozart 1260) is a commercial radio station licensed to Beverly Hills, California. Owned by Mount Wilson FM Broadcasters, the station serves Greater Los Angeles and much of surrounding Southern California. The KMZT studios are located in Los Angeles' Westwood neighborhood, while the station transmitter resides in the nearby Mission Hills neighborhood. Besides a standard analog transmission, KMZT broadcasts over through the HD Radio in-band on-channel standard for AM stations, is simulcast on low-power Los Angeles translator K252FO (98.3 FM) and the second HD digital subchannel of KKGO, and is available online.

Station history
KGIL began broadcasting October 19, 1947, on 1260 kHz with 1,000 watts of power full-time. The station was licensed to San Fernando Valley Broadcasting Company, with studios and executive offices at 4919 Van Nuys Boulevard, Sherman Oaks, California.

At that time, it aired a big band music format. KGIL aired other formats including talk until 1993.

From 1993 to 1995, it had the call letters KJQI, playing adult standards music. In 1995, it became K-NEWS, simulcasting with XESURF Tijuana (then with call letters XETIN) and now-defunct KNNZ in Costa Mesa, California. K-NEWS was an all-news radio service with content from the Associated Press or local announcers Peter Arbogast, Jim Roope, and H.K. Malay. K-NEWS was also the home of the Los Angeles Clippers and had an unprecedented 8 traffic reports an hour, causing competitors KNX and KFWB to add more traffic reports to their schedules. On January 3, 1997, the station reverted to the KGIL call letters and aired an all-Beatles format until August 31. On September 1, 1997, the station switched to a format of Broadway show tunes. In July 1998, the station switched to Music of Your Life. In 2000, KGIL adopted a mainstream jazz format and changed call letters to KJAZ. Then, in 2002, it took on the call letters KSUR and began broadcasting an adult standards format, changing its call letters to KKGO in 2005. From August 2004 to June 2005 the station had a 1950s-60s oldies format.

On December 1, 2006, KKGO changed to a country music format, filling the void left behind when KZLA became rhythmic adult contemporary as KMVN earlier in 2006. On February 26, 2007, KKGO swapped call signs and formats with FM sister station KMZT, moving the country music format to 105.1 FM, and the classical format known as "K-Mozart" to 1260 AM and to a new HD channel at 105.1 HD2. On October 29, 2007, KMZT changed its calls back to KGIL and flipped formats from classical to talk radio, with Michael Jackson as the headline host. Jackson was laid off from the station about a year later and replaced by John Ziegler, who left after a few months. Aside from Jackson and Ziegler, the bulk of KGIL's programming was syndicated, mostly of second-tier programs left over from what KFI, KRLA and KABC did not want.

On November 27, 2007, KGIL started simulcasting on XESURF (540 AM), which flipped from classic country music.

Owner Saul Levine decided to return KGIL to a music format after the debut of a similar talk radio format on KFWB, which took place in September 2009. On August 27, 2009, the station switched to a mix of oldies and adult standards as "Retro 1260." Mornings had John Regan, middays had Gary Hollis, afternoons had Kimber Murphy, followed by Chuck Southcott, who had worked at KGIL from 1962 to 1975. "Retro 1260" emphasized vocals and played Elvis Presley, Sam Cooke, The Beatles, and The Beach Boys, as well as Frank Sinatra, Ella Fitzgerald, Steve Tyrell, and Michael Feinstein. On March 28, 2011, the Los Angeles Times reported that the station would begin airing classical music on April 4. The final song on "Retro 1260" was "How Sweet It Is (To Be Loved by You)" by Keely Smith at 11:58 p.m. on April 3, 2011. "Retro 1260" would soon be relaunched as an internet stream at Retro105.com and on airing on KKGO's HD3 subchannel.

In addition to music, KGIL was the Los Angeles-area affiliate for California Golden Bears football and had aired games of the Los Angeles Clippers and Los Angeles Kings in the past to resolve time conflicts with other stations.

KMZT aired a classical music radio format that was also heard on sister station KMZT-FM (95.9 MHz) in Big Sur, California.

On August 19, 2016, KMZT switched to an adult standards format and rebranded as "Unforgettable 1260," duplicating the format and branding of sister station KNRY (1240 AM) in Monterey. On September 7, 2016, KMZT changed call letters to KBOQ. Those call letters previously belonged to a classic hits station owned by Saul Levine in Monterey. That station is now KDFG, and is owned by USC.

On March 17, 2017, the station flipped to oldies as "LA Oldies K-SURF." On March 20, 2017, KBOQ changed their call letters to KSUR.

In July 2020, the "K-Mozart" classical music format returned on KKGO-HD4.

On November 21, 2020, KSUR and KKGO-HD2 switched to full-time Christmas music. Subsequently, station management announced that it would return to a classical music format on December 1, with the oldies format remaining on KKGO-HD2. The station also changed back to its former KMZT call sign on December 1.

Former logos

References

External links
FCC History Cards for KMZT

Changes to KGIL line-up from November 27, 2007.

MZT (AM)
Radio stations established in 1947
1947 establishments in California
Classical music radio stations in the United States